Forest Town may refer to:

Forest Town, Gauteng, South Africa
Forest Town, Nottinghamshire, England
Forest Town Hall, Belgium